Cheke may refer to:

People
 Henry Cheke (c. 1548–1586), English politician
 John Cheke (1514–1557), English classical scholar and statesman; husband of Mary Cheke
 Mary Cheke (c. 1532-1616), English lady of the privy chamber, courtier poet, epigrammatist; wife of John Cheke

Other
 Cheke's day gecko, subspecies of day gecko, a lizard in the family Gekkonidae
 Cheke Holo language, Oceanic language spoken in the Solomon Islands
 Cheke's wood rail, extinct species of rail which was endemic to the Mascarene island of Mauritius